Utricularia brachiata is a small perennial carnivorous plant that belongs to the genus Utricularia. Its native distribution ranges from the Eastern Himalaya region to Yunnan. It was originally described by Daniel Oliver in 1859.

See also 
 List of Utricularia species

References 

Carnivorous plants of Asia
Flora of Bhutan
Flora of Myanmar
Flora of China
Flora of Nepal
brachiata
Taxa named by Daniel Oliver